Iveşti may refer to several places in Romania:

 Ivești, Galați, a commune in Galați County
 Ivești, Vaslui, a commune in Vaslui County